Gregory Lawson Craddock (born February 20, 1992) is an American professional road and track racing cyclist, who currently rides for UCI WorldTeam . He is known for his achievement in finishing the 2018 Tour de France despite being seriously injured in the opening stage, and for raising funds for a hurricane-damaged velodrome as a result.

Cycling career

Craddock raced in the 2018 Tour de France and crashed violently during the first stage, causing a hairline fracture in his scapula, but continued racing. He was the last rider to cross the finish line and the were many photos of him with blood covering the entire left side of his face. After that crash, he took to social media announcing he was donating $100 for every stage he finished to the Greater Houston Cycling Association in the rebuild of the Alkek Velodrome, where Craddock got his start in cycling and which was damaged by Hurricane Harvey.  A GoFundMe page was also set up for people to make direct donations to the velodrome. Craddock finished the race as the "lanterne rouge", becoming the first rider in Tour history to hold last place after every stage and earning over US$250,000 for the cause. He is the only American to be awarded the lanterne rouge.

On June 11, 2020, USA Cycling announced that Craddock will be on their Men's Road Long Team for the 2020 Summer Olympics (to be held July 23 to August 8, 2021). In October 2020, he was named in the startlist for the 2020 Giro d'Italia. He was also chosen as part of the team for the 2021 Vuelta a España where on stage 19 he rode at the front of the race and controlled the final kilometers of the breakaway to contain any attacks and put his teammate, Magnus Cort, in a position to win the stage. As Cort attacked Craddock fell back and watched as his teammate won the stage, and five seconds later when he crossed the line threw his arms in the air celebrating the victory.

Major results

2008
 National Novice Track Championships
1st  Scratch race
1st  Points race
2009
 1st Stage 1 (ITT) Edgar Soto Memorial
 1st Stage 2b (ITT) Tour du Pays de Vaud
 2nd  Time trial, UCI World Road Junior Championships
 4th Overall Trofeo Karlsberg
2010
 National Junior Road Championships
1st  Road race
1st  Time trial
 1st  Overall Trofeo Karlsberg
1st Stages 2 & 3 (ITT)
 1st Stage 1 Tour de New Braunfels
 1st Stage 1 (TTT) Regio Tour
 2nd Overall Trophée Centre Morbihan
1st Stage 2 (ITT)
 3rd  Time trial, UCI World Road Junior Championships
 3rd Overall Tour du Pays de Vaud
1st Prologue & Stage 4 (ITT)
 3rd Paris–Roubaix Juniors
2011
 1st Stage 2 (ITT) Le Triptyque des Monts et Châteaux
 1st Stage 10 Tour de la Guadeloupe
 1st Stage 2 Hotter'N Hell Hundred
 2nd Time trial, National Road Under–23 Championships
 4th Overall Tour de Berlin
 4th Overall Tulsa Tough
2012
 2nd Time trial, National Road Under–23 Championships
 3rd Time trial, Pan–American Road Under–23 Championships
 3rd Overall Cascade Cycling Classic
 3rd Copperas Cove Classic
 5th Overall Tour of the Gila
1st Stage 5
2013
 2nd Overall Le Triptyque des Monts et Châteaux
1st Stage 2
 7th Overall USA Pro Cycling Challenge
 8th Overall Tour of California
1st  Young rider classification
2014
 3rd Overall Tour of California
1st  Young rider classification
2016
 5th Overall Tour of California
 6th Overall Critérium International
 9th Overall Tour of the Basque Country
2018
 1st  Mountains classification, Settimana Internazionale Coppi e Bartali
 9th Amstel Gold Race
2019
 1st Stage 1 (TTT) Tour Colombia
 6th Time trial, UCI Road World Championships
 7th Overall Tour of Utah
2020
 1st Stage 1 (TTT) Tour Colombia
2021
 National Road Championships
1st  Time trial
5th Road race
2022
 1st  Time trial, National Road Championships
  Combativity award Stages 15 & 17 Vuelta a España

Grand Tour general classification results timeline

References

External links

 Awesome Lawson Craddock at Alkek Velodrome - Greater Houston Cycling Foundation

1992 births
Living people
American male cyclists
Sportspeople from Houston
Olympic cyclists of the United States
Cyclists at the 2020 Summer Olympics
Cyclists from Texas